Pacha Gul Wafadar was born on 6 March 1943 in Paktia, Afghanistan. Educated in Kabul and Russia, he started school at Harbi Shownzi (Army high school) in 1950. After graduation in 1962, he went to Saint Petersburg for higher education in the university of Budyonny Military Academy of the Signal Corps, majoring in signal engineering.

References

External links
 video
 Embassy of Afghanistan, New Delhi

Afghan politicians
Living people
1943 births
Pashtun people
People from Paktia Province
Afghan expatriates in Bulgaria
Ambassadors of Afghanistan to India
Ambassadors of Afghanistan to Bulgaria
Ambassadors of Afghanistan to Libya